The Córdoba-Navarco Fault is a sinistral strike-slip fault in the department of Quindío in west-central Colombia.

The fault segment pertaining to the megaregional Romeral Fault System is a set of two faults that are active, causing the major 1999 Armenia earthquake with approximately 1185 fatalities.

Etymology 
The fault is named after Córdoba and the Navarco River in Quindío.

Description 

The fault section is formed by the Córdoba and Navarco Faults, which are eastern strands of Romeral Fault System, south of the city of Armenia. These faults lie within the epicenter area of the Armenia earthquake of January 25, 1999. The faults extend through sheared cataclastic and undeformed basaltic and sedimentary Cretaceous oceanic rocks, cropping out on the eastern slope of the Central Ranges of Colombia. It separates the Córdoba Complex from the Quebradagrande Complex.

Well preserved fault trace controls stream drainages. The Córdoba-Navarco Fault forms fault saddles and eroded fault scarps. Neotectonic features are not very outstanding. Slopes in this part of the Central Ranges are rather steep, so erosion rate is high.

The fault terminates in the south against the Ibagué Fault.

Activity 

On January 25, 1999 a major earthquake hit the capitals of Quindío, Armenia, and Risaralda, Pereira. The natural disaster caused around 1185 casualties in central Colombia and was the strongest earthquake in 16 years.

See also 

 List of earthquakes in Colombia
 Armenia Fault
 Montenegro Fault

References

Bibliography

Maps 
 
 

Seismic faults of Colombia
Strike-slip faults
Active faults
Geography of Quindío Department
Earthquakes in Colombia